Byron Nicholson Scott (March 21, 1903 – December 21, 1991) was an American lawyer and politician. The Democrat Scott served as the second United States Representative for California's 18th congressional district for two terms, from 1935 to 1939.

Background
Scott was born on March 21, 1903 in Council Grove in Morris County, Kansas. He was raised in Council Grove, and went through the town's public school system. He went to the University of Kansas at Lawrence, and graduated from the school in 1924. After graduating, Scott became a teacher in Tucson, Arizona and taught there until 1926. Afterwards, he moved to go teach at public schools in Long Beach, California. During the while, he went to the University of Southern California where he obtained is Master's degree in 1930. He taught in Long Beach until 1934, when he got involved in politics.

Politics
Scott first served as a delegate to the California Democratic state convention in 1934. Scott also ran for the United States House of Representatives seat for California's recently formed 18th congressional district. After getting the Democratic nomination, he ran against Republican William Brayton. Scott defeated Brayton by capturing 56.3% of the vote, in comparison to his 43.2%. From June 23, 1936 to June 27, 1936, he served as a delegate in the Democratic National Convention held at Convention Hall in Philadelphia, Pennsylvania, in which they renominated Franklin D. Roosevelt to be the presidential candidate, and John Nance Garner as his vice-presidential running mate. Later that year, Scott ran for re-election as the representative for the 18th district, and easily defeated Republican challenger James F. Collins by more than 18,000 votes in a 58.9%-41.0% majority.

In the 1938 House elections, Scott was challenged by Thomas M. Eaton. In a close race, Eaton squeezed past Scott by a mere 342 vote, or 0.3% margin. For the next two years, he served as the secretary of the California state Highway Commission. Scott again ran for the seat in 1940, but lost to Republican challenger Ward Johnson by a nearly 10% majority. After spending 1941 and 1942 in the construction business, Scott served on Roosevelt's World War II War Production Board in Washington, D.C. until the end of the war in 1945.

Law practice

Scott spent the next few years pursuing his Bachelor of Laws degree from the National University School of Law.  After graduating in 1949, he was admitted to the bar in Washington, D.C. where he started up his practice.

From 1953 to 1955, he represented U.S. Treasury official William Henry Taylor before the International Organization Employees Loyalty Board (IOELB).

In 1954, he represented U.S. Treasury official George A. Eddy during congressional loyalty/security hearings related to ongoing investigations into Eddy's Treasury superior Harry Dexter White.

In 1959, he represented Frank Kameny in his lawsuit against the Secretary of the Army.  Kameny, who had been fired "for homosexuality", filed the case challenging the US Government's ban on homosexual employees.  After summary judgment was granted at the Justice Department's request, Scott represented Kameny in his appeal.  Kameny worked alone after losing appeal, basing his Petition for Writ of Certiorari on a sample provided by Scott.  His was the first gay rights case to be presented to the United States Supreme Court.  Although the Court denied him certiorari, On June 29, 2009, John Berry (Director of the Office of Personnel Management) formally apologized to Kameny on behalf of the United States government.  Kameny's filings and other papers are housed in the Library of Congress. Scott retired from his law practice in 1979, and lived as a resident of Sun City, California until his death on December 21, 1991 at the age of 88.

See also
 Frank Kameny
 George A. Eddy

References

External links
Biography at the Biographical Directory of the United States Congress
The Political Graveyard profile for Byron N. Scott

Democratic Party members of the United States House of Representatives from California
University of Kansas alumni
University of Southern California alumni
1903 births
1991 deaths
20th-century American politicians
People from Council Grove, Kansas